The 1983 St. Louis Cardinals season was the 64th season the team was in the National Football League. The Cardinals won eight games, including victories over both participants in that year's AFC Championship Game, the Raiders and Seahawks. However, the team also lost in meetings over both participants of the 1983 NFC Championship Game, the 49ers and the Redskins. Despite their winning record, the team failed to reach the playoffs.

The Cardinals had a winning record, despite being outscored by a total of 54 points during the regular season. In fact, St. Louis’ 428 points surrendered was, to that point, the most points given up by a team with a winning record in NFL history; it is still second-most all time.

Personnel

Staff

Roster

Schedule

Standings

Notes

References 

1983
St. Louis Cardinals